Kovur Assembly constituency is a constituency of the Andhra Pradesh Legislative Assembly, India. It is one of 8 constituencies in the Nellore district.

Nallapareddy Prasanna Kumar Reddy of YSR Congress Party is currently representing the constituency.

Overview
It is part of the Nellore Lok Sabha constituency along with another six Vidhan Sabha segments, namely, Kandukur in Prakasam district, Kavali, Atmakur, Nellore City, Nellore Rural and Udayagiri in Nellore district.

Mandals

Members of Legislative Assembly Buchireddipalem

Members of Legislative Assembly Kovur

Election results

Assembly Elections 2019

Assembly elections 2014

Assembly By-Elections 2012

Assembly Elections 2009

Assembly Elections 2004

Assembly elections 1999

Assembly elections 1994

Assembly elections 1989

Assembly elections 1985

Assembly elections 1983

Assembly elections 1978

Assembly elections 1972

Assembly elections 1967

Assembly elections 1962

Assembly Elections 1952
				

		

			

 List of constituencies of Andhra Pradesh Legislative Assembly

See also
 List of constituencies of Andhra Pradesh Vidhan Sabha

References

Assembly constituencies of Andhra Pradesh